Charlotte Haug (born 21 May 1959) is a Norwegian physician and editor, former editor of the Journal of the Norwegian Medical Association.

Haug graduated as dr.med. in infection immunology from the University of Oslo in 1999, and eventually as Master of Science in health research from Stanford University. She edited the Journal of the Norwegian Medical Association from 2002 to 2015.

References

1959 births
Living people
University of Oslo alumni
Stanford University alumni
Norwegian expatriates in the United States
Norwegian immunologists
Women immunologists
Norwegian journal editors
Norwegian women editors